Alva Cornwall "Ollie" Smith  (November 1, 1871 – October 6, 1941) was an American college football player and coach. Born in Cleveland, Smith attended high school at Cleveland’s Central High School.   

Smith played football at Case School of Applied Science—now known as Case Western Reserve University as a quarterback from 1891 to 1894.  Smith captained the Case football team the two seasons, including the undefeated 1893 Case football team.  He majored in chemistry and was a member of Zeta Psi Fraternity.   

Smith coached at Case for three seasons, from 1896 to 1898, compiling a record of 10–10. He has a 2–1 record against Ohio State and a 2–1 mark against rival Western Reserve.

Head coaching record

References

1871 births
Year of death missing
American football quarterbacks
19th-century players of American football
Case Western Spartans football coaches
Case Western Spartans football players
Sportspeople from Cleveland
Coaches of American football from Ohio
Players of American football from Cleveland